"24/7" is a song by the American rapper Meek Mill featuring English singer Ella Mai. With a sampling of "Me, Myself, and I" by Beyoncé, the song debuted and peaked at number 54 on the week of December 15, 2018, on the Billboard Hot 100, a week after the release of the album. The track was released as the second single from Meek Mill's album Championships on April 16, 2019.

Charts

Weekly charts

Year-end charts

Certifications

References

2019 songs
2019 singles
Meek Mill songs
Ella Mai songs
Atlantic Records singles
Maybach Music Group singles
Interscope Records singles
Songs written by Beyoncé
Songs written by Scott Storch
Songs written by Meek Mill
Songs written by Nija Charles
Songs written by Oz (record producer)
Songs written by Ella Mai